Wörbke  is a river of North Rhine-Westphalia, Germany. The Wörbke is approximately 4 km long, a right tributary of the Werre in the Lippe district in Ostwestfalen-Lippe. The source of the river has an elevation of 260 metres and the mouth an elevation of 148 metres.

See also
List of rivers of North Rhine-Westphalia

References

Rivers of North Rhine-Westphalia
Rivers of Germany